Stereotaxic atlas is a number of records of brain structure of a particular animal accompanied with coordinates used in stereotactic surgery.

External links
A Stereotaxic Atlas Of The Brain Of The Zebra Finch

Neurosurgery